Rex Nelson is a long time college sports broadcaster, columnist, reporter, author, political appointee, and chronicler of Arkansas history. He is a Senior Editor and columnist for the  Arkansas Democrat-Gazette. He was policy and communications director for governor Mike Huckabee. In 2005 Nelson was appointed by U.S. president George W. Bush to the Delta Regional Authority.

Nelson is a native of Arkadelphia. He graduated summa cum laude from Ouachita Baptist University in 1982  and he announces their college football games. He received a B.A. in Mass Communications from the school.

Nelson was inducted into the Arkansas Sportscasters and Sportswriters Hall of Fame and was named Rural Advocate of the Year for the state of Arkansas in 2016 by Governor Asa Hutchinson and the Arkansas Rural Development Commission.

Career
Nelson was Washington Bureau Chief for the Arkansas Democrat, edited the Arkansas Business, was the Political Editor of the Arkansas Democrat-Gazette from 1992 until 1996, hosted a daily political talk radio show, and was campaign manager and Director of Policy and Communications for Arkansas Governor Mike Huckabee.

In 2011 he became president of the Arkansas Independent Colleges and Universities association. He published a blog called Rex Nelson's Southern Fried. In 2017 he initiated an Arkansas Food Hall of Fame.

In 1994, Arkansas Business named him one of their "40 under 40". He hosted the "Respond to Rush" show on KARN-AM and was a regular panelist on AETN's "Arkansas Week" program.

Bibliography
 Southern Fried: Going Whole Hog in a State of Wonder, October 1, 2016
Giving Until It Feels Good: Ben M. Elrod: Arkansas Educator and Fundraiser, July 19, 2016, by Rex Nelson and Ian Cosh
 The Hillary Factor: The Story of America's First Lady. (1993) cowritten with Phillip Martin
Articles by Nelson at the Northwest Arkansas Democrat Gazette

References

Year of birth missing (living people)
Living people
American sports journalists